MCU 8051 IDE is a free software integrated development environment for microcontrollers based on the 8051. MCU 8051 IDE has a built-in simulator not only for the MCU itself, but also LCD displays and simple LED outputs as well as button inputs. It supports two programming languages: C (using SDCC) and assembly and runs on both Windows and Unix-based operating systems, such as FreeBSD and Linux.

Features 
 MCU simulator with many debugging features: register status, step by step, interrupt viewer, external memory viewer, code memory viewer, etc.
 Simulator for certain electronic peripherals like LEDs, LED displays, LED matrices, LCD displays, etc.
 Support for C language
 Native macro-assembler
 Support for ASEM-51 and other assemblers
 Advanced text editor with syntax highlighting and validation
 Support for vim and nano embedded in the IDE
 Simple hardware programmer for certain AT89Sxx MCUs
 Scientific calculator: time delay calculation and code generation, base converter, etc.
 Hexadecimal editor

Supported MCUs 
The current version 1.4 supports many microcontrollers including:
 * 8051
 * 80C51
 * 8052
 * AT89C2051
 * AT89C4051
 * AT89C51
 * AT89C51RC
 * AT89C52
 * AT89C55WD
 * AT89LV51
 * AT89LV52
 * AT89LV55
 * AT89S52
 * AT89LS51
 * AT89LS52
 * AT89S8253
 * AT89S2051
 * AT89S4051
 * T87C5101
 * T83C5101
 * T83C5102
 * TS80C32X2
 * TS80C52X2
 * TS87C52X2
 * AT80C32X2
 * AT80C52X2
 * AT87C52X2
 * AT80C54X2
 * AT80C58X2
 * AT87C54X2
 * AT87C58X2
 * TS80C54X2
 * TS80C58X2
 * TS87C54X2
 * TS87C58X2
 * TS80C31X2
 * AT80C31X2
 * 8031
 * 8751
 * 8032
 * 8752
 * 80C31
 * 87C51
 * 80C52
 * 87C52
 * 80C32
 * 80C54
 * 87C54
 * 80C58
 * 87C58

See also 
 8051 information
 Assembly language
 C language

External links 
 
 Paul's 8051 Tools, Projects and Free Code
 ASEM-51
 SDCC

Free integrated development environments
Embedded systems